The Dayton Open was a golf tournament on the Nationwide Tour from 1999 to 2003. It was played at The Golf Club at Yankee Trace, in  the Dayton, Ohio suburb of Centerville.

The purse in 2003 was $450,000, with $81,000 going to the winner.

Winners

References
 

Former Korn Ferry Tour events
Golf in Ohio
Sports competitions in Dayton, Ohio
Recurring sporting events established in 1999
Recurring sporting events disestablished in 2003
1999 establishments in Ohio
2003 disestablishments in Ohio